Aplin is an unincorporated community and census-designated place (CDP) in Perry County, Arkansas, United States. It was first listed as a CDP in the 2020 census with a population of 100.

The Camp House, which is listed on the National Register of Historic Places, is near the community.

Demographics

2020 census

Note: the US Census treats Hispanic/Latino as an ethnic category. This table excludes Latinos from the racial categories and assigns them to a separate category. Hispanics/Latinos can be of any race.

Education
It is in the Perryville School District. Perryville High School is its zoned comprehensive high school.

References

Unincorporated communities in Perry County, Arkansas
Unincorporated communities in Arkansas
Census-designated places in Arkansas